Grassley is a surname. Notable people with the surname include:

Chuck Grassley (born 1933), American politician
Pat Grassley (born 1983), American politician

See also
Grassle